Royal Swets & Zeitlinger Holding NV (Koninklijke Swets & Zeitlinger Holding NV), operating under the trade name Swets, was a group of information services companies operating worldwide as an intermediary between publishers and libraries. Swets provided overall management and processing of subscriptions to scientific and professional printed and electronic publications for libraries. The parent company of Royal Swets & Zeitlinger Holding was Swets & Zeitlinger Group BV, and its main trading subsidiary was Swets Information Services BV. The Swets companies were progressively declared bankrupt between September and November 2014.

Swets' 2013 annual report, released on 8 August 2014, included the following market update report: "2013 was a turbulent year for Swets. It has become clear that the intended transformation of Swets requires more capital and scale than is currently available. The ultimate shareholders of Swets Group in close the lenders have decided to put all shares of Royal Swets & Zeitlinger Holding N.V. up for sale and have initiated a competitive auction process with a planned sale in Q3 2014. The lenders support the plan and have decided to postpone the demand for repayment as long as the execution of the sales process develops according to the plan". The market update further stated that as Swets had "failed to meet its covenant requirements related to the long term financing. As a consequence of this breach the lenders are entitled to demand immediate repayment." The problems were attributed to the move from print to digital publishing, which has lower commissions, and facilitates direct publisher–customer relationships in place of intermediaries.

History 
 Founded by Adriaan Swets & Heinrich Zeitlinger in 1901
 Swets bought out Zeitlinger after one year
 Swets remained 100% owned by the Swets family until the mid-nineties
 In 2003, Swets & Zeitlinger Publishers was sold to Taylor & Francis
 In 2007 Swets was sold to Gilde, a Dutch investment firm
 In 2008/09 Swets opened offices in India, New Zealand, Finland, Austria & Switzerland, China
 Also in 2008 Swets acquired Boekhandel E. Frencken BV
 In 2010 started comprehensive e-book catalog and procurement options, supplying over 1 million e-books in 2011
 In 2011 Swets acquired the publisher communication services company Accucoms
 In 2014 Gilde put Swets up for sale.
 On 23 September 2014, Swets Information Services BV filed for and was granted bankruptcy.
 Between September and November 2014, Koninklijke Swets & Zeitlinger Holding and the other Swets companies were declared bankrupt.
 Private investment company Oak Point Partners acquired the remnant assets, consisting of any known and unknown assets that weren't previously administered, from the Swets Information Services, Inc. Bankruptcy Estate on January 9, 2018.

Partnerships 
Swets partner products and services were:

 ALJC (by ALPSP)
 PressDisplay (by Newspaperdirect)
 e-Select
 Scholarly Stats
 Document Delivery Service
 Mendeley Institutional Edition, powered by Swets
 Discovery Services (by Deep Web Technologies)

See also 
 Electronic publishing

References

External links
Swets bankruptcy documents at CMS

Privately held companies of the Netherlands
Multinational companies headquartered in the Netherlands
Business services companies established in 1901
Business services companies disestablished in the 21st century
Dutch companies established in 1901
Dutch companies disestablished in 2014